Every Day Fiction (ISSN 1918-1000) is a Canadian flash fiction magazine founded in 2007 and published by Every Day Publishing Ltd. It is typically published on a daily schedule.

Every Day Fiction publishes flash fiction stories of all genres, and podcasts stories that have a high level of appeal with their readers. Additionally, they have published multiple Best of Every Day Fiction anthologies consisting of the 100 best stories appearing in the magazine for their respective years. They have nominated work for the Pushcart Prize. In part because of its relatively large audience, EDF has placed highly in the Preditors & Editors Readers Choice Poll and in 2010 Shaun Simon's story "Snowman" won 1st place in its category.

In 2010, Every Day Fiction was listed by Writer's Digest as one of the 50 Best Online Literary Markets, and has been cited by numerous print sources including The Wall Street Journal, the Vancouver Sun, and the StarPhoenix.

History
Every Day Fiction is notable for being one of the first online fiction magazines to abandon the print model that had been migrated onto the web by its contemporaries, and instead focus on a format in use by several major blogs—dynamic content published in high volume. A key component of the site has been its focus on social media, with readers being able to vote and comment on stories.

The model proved to be popular, and in 2008 Lapp boasted that the site had "nearly 1,500 RSS and e-mail subscribers, averaging over 10,000 unique readers a month".

Editors
 Jordan Lapp, Managing Editor 2007–2009, Executive Editor 2009–Present
 Camille Gooderham Campbell, Editor 2007–09, Managing Editor 2009–Present
 Elissa Vann Struth, Editor 2009–10
 Carol Clark, Editor 2010–Present
 J.C. Towler, Editor 2010–Present
 Joseph Kaufman, Editor 2011–Present

In 2009, founding editor Jordan Lapp won 1st place in Writers of the Future and announced that he would be retiring from the day-to-day operations of the magazine in order to focus on the magazine's parent company, Every Day Publishing Ltd, which has since launched or acquired three more magazines: Every Day Poets, Flash Fiction Chronicles, and Ray Gun Revival.

Authors published in EDF
 Megan Arkenberg
 Jimmy Caputo
 Beth Cato
 P. Djèlí Clark
 Guy Anthony De Marco
 Kristi DeMeester
 Bosley Gravel
 Ken Liu
 Ben Loory
 Kristine Ong Muslim
 Mark Noce
 Sarah Pinsker
 Cat Rambo
 Bruce Holland Rogers
 Ramon Rozas III
 Wayne Scheer
 Kevin Shamel
 Alex Shvartsman
 Shaun Simon
 E. Catherine Tobler
 James Van Pelt
 Damien Angelica Walters
 A. C. Wise
 Sylvia Spruck Wrigley
 William R. Stoddart
 Jacob Pérez

See also
 List of literary magazines
 Science fiction magazine
 Fantasy fiction magazine
 Horror fiction magazine
 List of Canadian magazines

References

External links 
 Every Day Fiction (official web site)
 Snowman by Shaun Simon

2007 establishments in Canada
Science fiction magazines published in Canada
Fantasy fiction magazines
Horror fiction magazines
Magazines established in 2007